The first USS Triton (later YT-10) was an iron-hulled tug purchased by the U.S. Navy in 1889.  After more than 40 years of service as a Navy yard tug, she was sold off in 1930 and began a second career as a commercial tug.

Triton was built in 1888, hull no. 287 at the John H. Dialogue shipyard in Camden, New Jersey.  She was built for P. Dougherty & Company, a Baltimore-based towing firm, and named the Douglas H. Thomas after a prominent Baltimore banker with ties to local shipping.  Her official U.S. number was 157229.

Construction
The Triton's hull was of riveted iron construction, with a long deckhouse topped by the pilot house. Her tonnage was 140.52 gross and 70.21 net.

Coal capacity was 43 tons, and she burned about two tons per 24 hours.

She was equipped with a  reversible triple expansion steam engine.

Navy service
Triton spent her entire career operating from the Washington Navy Yard at Washington, D.C. She frequently steamed down the Potomac River to the naval reservation at Indian Head, Maryland; during 1900 alone, she recorded 198 round-trips between Washington and Indian Head. During Tritons career, Indian Head was home first to the Naval Proving Grounds in the 1890s and then to the Naval Powder Factory during the first half of the 20th century; in all probability, Triton towed barges to Indian Head laden with materials to be used there in the testing of naval guns and in the production of gunpowder and explosives.

On 17 July 1921, the Navy changed Triton's designation to "YT-10" (yard tug) in accordance with the new system of alphanumeric hull designations adopted that day.

After 41 years of Navy service, the Triton was finally stricken from the Navy Directory on 19 May 1930, and sold on 15 September 1930.

Subsequent history
She was bought by a Boston-based towing firm in 1932 and named Melrose.  Her steam propulsion system was replaced with a  diesel-electric system.  She spent the next 13 years plying New England waters.

In 1945, she was acquired by the Steers Sand and Gravel Company, of New York, and named J Rich Steers, then renamed Gwendoline Steers in 1951.  She was lost with all nine crew members on 30 December 1962, at the entrance to Huntington Bay (Long Island Sound), NY, during a brutal winter gale.

References

Department of the Navy: Navy History and Heritage Command: Online Library of Selected Images: U.S. Navy Ships: USS Triton (1889–1930, later YT-10)
NavSource Online: Service Ship Photo Archive YT-10 Triton

External links
 Wreck Divers of L.I. Sound
 List of Yard Tugs built with specs

Tugs of the United States Navy
Ships built by Dialogue & Company
1888 ships
Spanish–American War auxiliary ships of the United States
World War I auxiliary ships of the United States